Udaysingrao Gaikwad was an Indian politician. He was elected to the Lok Sabha, lower house of the Parliament of India from Kolhapur, Maharashtra as a member of the Indian National Congress.

References

External links
 Official Biographical Sketch in Lok Sabha Website

India MPs 1980–1984
India MPs 1984–1989
India MPs 1989–1991
India MPs 1991–1996
India MPs 1996–1997
Indian National Congress politicians
Lok Sabha members from Maharashtra
1930 births
2014 deaths
Marathi politicians
People from Kolhapur